Loba or La Loba (she-wolf in Spanish) may refer to:

Music
 Loba, the Spanish-language version of the album She Wolf by Shakira
 "Loba" (Shakira song), the Spanish version of title track
La Loba, a 2010 Spanish-language album and the title track by Ivonne Montero

Film and television
 The She-Wolf (1965 film), originally released as La Loba
La Loba (telenovela), a 2010 Mexican telenovela

Other uses
 "Loba", a book length poem by feminist Beat icon Diane di Prima
 Loba (card game), a South American card game
 Loba, a genre of Pashto music
 Loba, a gram panchayat of Dubrajpur, West Bengal, India
 Loba, sparring in the Kashmiri martial art of Sqay
 Loba, a playable character in a battle royale game Apex Legends

See also 
 Lhoba, an Asian ethnic grouping
 She-wolf (disambiguation)